Helena Buljan (born 9 July 1941) is a Croatian actress. She appeared in more than sixty films since 1964.

Selected filmography

References

External links 

1941 births
Living people
Croatian film actresses
Vladimir Nazor Award winners
Croatian theatre people